Haboroteuthis is an extinct genus of squid that lived during the Cretaceous period. The only species that has been classified in the genius is H. poseidon.

References

Prehistoric cephalopod genera
Squid
Cretaceous cephalopods